The City of Greater Geelong is a local government area in the Barwon South West region of Victoria, Australia, located in the western part of the state. It is primarily urban with the vast majority of its population living in the Greater Geelong urban area, while other significant settlements within the LGA include Anakie, Balliang, Barwon Heads, Batesford, Ceres, Clifton Springs, Drysdale, Lara, Ocean Grove, Portarlington and St Leonards. It was formed in 1993 from the amalgamation of the Rural City of Bellarine, Shire of Corio, City of Geelong, City of Geelong West, City of Newtown, City of South Barwon, and parts of Shire of Barrabool and Shire of Bannockburn.

The City is governed and administered by the Greater Geelong City Council; its seat of local government and administrative centre is located at the council headquarters in Geelong, it also has service centres located in Drysdale, Ocean Grove and several other locations within Geelong. The City is named after the main urban settlement located in the centre-west of the LGA, that is Geelong, which is also the LGA's most populous urban centre with a population of 211,986.

In 2019, City of Greater Geelong announced a new headquarters across the road from WorkSafe Victoria. The project will be part of the new "Civic Precinct" in the Geelong CBD.

History of former municipalities

1838 – Geelong (Aboriginal word for 'Ocean') region declared a town 
1849 – Geelong incorporated as a Town 
1853 – Barrabool road district proclaimed
1853 – Portarlington Road District proclaimed
1856 – Connewarre Road District proclaimed
1857 – South Barwon Municipal District proclaimed
1857 – South Barwon Road District proclaimed
1858 – Newtown and Chilwell borough proclaimed
1860 – Portarlington Road District renamed as Indented Head Road District
1861 – Corio Road District proclaimed
1862 – Bannockburn Road District proclaimed
1863 – Meredith Road District proclaimed
1863 – Queenscliff and Point Lonsdale separated from Indented Head Road District to form Queenscliffe Municipal District. Redesignated as Queenscliffe Borough October 1963.
1863 – South Barwon Borough created by amalgamating South Barwon Municipal District and South Barwon Road District
1864 – Bannockburn Road District redesignated as Shire
1864 – Corio Road District redesignated as Shire
1865 – Indented Head Road District redesignated and renamed as Bellarine Shire
1874 – South Barwon Shire created by amalgamating Connewarre Road District and South Barwon Borough
1875 – Geelong West Borough proclaimed
1910 – Geelong proclaimed a City
1915 – Meredith Shire added to Bannockburn Shire
1922 – Geelong West proclaimed a Town
1924 – Newtown and Chilwell proclaimed a Town
1929 – Geelong West proclaimed a City
1959 – Newtown and Chilwell proclaimed a City
1967 – Newtown and Chilwell City renamed as Newtown City
1974 – South Barwon proclaimed a City
1989 – Bellarine proclaimed a City
1993 – City of Greater Geelong formed by amalgamating part of Bannockburn Shire, part of Barrabool Shire, Bellarine Rural City, Corio Shire, Geelong City, Newtown City & South Barwon City. The part that had been in South Barwon City was then transferred to Surf Coast Shire on its creation in March 1994.

Sourced from Appendix V, A Journey to Destiny 1890–1990 – 100 Years of Cement Manufacturing at Fyansford by Australian Cement Limited .

Council

2017 Council
Due to conflicts in the previous council a new electoral structure was established for Geelong in 2017. The number of wards was reduced to 4 with 3 councillors for each (except Windermere having 2) elected by proportional representation. Residents were also no longer able to directly elect a mayor. 
 The current councillors, in order of election at the 2020 election, are:

Administrators
In December 2015, the Minister for Local Government Natalie Hutchins appointed a Commission of Inquiry into the Greater Geelong City Council in response to concerns about the workplace culture and adequacy of governance structures.

The Inquiry found that the council is riven with conflict, unable to manage Geelong's economic challenges, has dysfunctional leadership and has a culture of bullying.

On the recommendation of the Commission, the Victorian Government dismissed the entire Greater Geelong City Council on 16 April 2016 and appointed Yehudi Blacher as interim administrator. On 25 May 2016, Dr Kathy Alexander (chairperson), Peter Dorling and Laurinda Gardner were sworn in as administrators, replacing Yehudi Blacher.

Under the Local Government (Greater Geelong City Council) Act 2016, the panel of administrators constitutes the Greater Geelong City Council, and has the same functions, powers and duties as the Greater Geelong City Council and its councillors. Likewise, the chairperson of the panel of administrators has the same functions, powers and duties as the mayor of the council.

The council was run by administrators until fresh council elections were held on 27 October 2017.

Former and current Mayors
 Gerry Smith (1995–1998)
 Ken Jarvis (1998–2000)
 Michael Crutchfield (2000–2001)
 Stretch Kontelj (2001–2002)
 Barbara Abley (2002–2004)
 Ed Coppe (2004)
 Shane Dowling (2004–2005)
 Peter McMullin (2005–2006)
 Bruce Harwood (2006–2008)
 John Mitchell (2008–2012)
 Keith Fagg (2012–2013)
 Darryn Lyons (2013–2016)
 Bruce Harwood (2017–2019)
 Stephanie Asher (2019–2022)
 Peter Murrihy (2022-present)

Former and current Deputy Mayors
 Tony Ansett (2003–2004)
 John Mitchell (2007–2008)
 Rod Macdonald (2008–2009)
 Bruce Harwood (2009–2010)
 Cameron Granger (2010–2012)
 Stretch Kontelj (2012–2013)
 Bruce Harwood (2013–2014)
 Michelle Heagney (2014–2016)
 Peter Murrihy (2017–2019)
 Kylie Grzybek (2019–2020)
 Trent Sullivan (2020-present)

Administration and governance
The council meets in the council chambers at the council headquarters in the Geelong City Hall Offices, which is also the location of the council's administrative activities. Council customer service centres are located in Belmont, Corio, Drysdale, Geelong West, Ocean Grove, Waurn Ponds and at Brougham St in Geelong.

Townships and localities
The 2021 census, the city had a population of 271,057 up from 233,429 in the 2016 census

^ - Territory divided with another LGA

Sister cities 
Geelong has sister city relations with the following cities:
  Viqueque, East Timor
  Lianyungang, China
  Izumiotsu, Japan

See also
 List of mayors of Geelong
 List of Geelong suburbs
 List of localities (Victoria)

References

External links
 
Greater Geelong City Council official website
Geelong Region Alliance Website
Metlink local public transport map
Link to Land Victoria interactive maps

Local government areas of Victoria (Australia)
Barwon South West (region)